Patricia Duffy Barksdale (born February 26, 1971) is an American lawyer who serves as a United States magistrate judge for the United States District Court for the Middle District of Florida and is a former nominee to be a United States district judge of the same court.

Biography

Barksdale was born on February 26, 1971, in Washington, D.C. She received a Bachelor of Arts degree in 1993 from the University of Florida. She received a Juris Doctor, Order of the Coif and magna cum laude, in 1996 from the Fredric G. Levin College of Law at the University of Florida. She began her legal career as a law clerk to Judge Emmett Ripley Cox of the United States Court of Appeals for the Eleventh Circuit, from 1996 to 1997. She worked as an associate in the Jacksonville, Florida, office of McGuireWoods, from 1997 to 2000, and as counsel for CSX Transportation, from 2000 to 2004. From 2004 to 2005, she served as a law clerk to the Judge Timothy J. Corrigan of the United States District Court for the Middle District of Florida. She served as an Assistant United States Attorney for the United States Attorney's Office for the Middle District of Florida from 2005 to 2013, during which she served as Senior Litigation Counsel from 2011 to 2013. She has served as a United States magistrate judge for the United States District Court for the Middle District of Florida since being sworn in on November 1, 2013.

Expired nomination to district court

On April 28, 2016, President Barack Obama nominated Barksdale to serve as a United States District Judge of the United States District Court for the Middle District of Florida, to the seat vacated by Judge John E. Steele, who took senior status on June 3, 2015. Her nomination expired on January 3, 2017, with the end of the 114th Congress.

References

1971 births
Living people
20th-century American women lawyers
20th-century American lawyers
21st-century American judges
21st-century American women judges
Assistant United States Attorneys
Florida lawyers
Fredric G. Levin College of Law alumni
People from Washington, D.C.
United States magistrate judges
University of Florida alumni